Liability-driven investment policies and asset management decisions are those largely determined by the sum of current and future liabilities attached to the investor, be it a household or an institution. As it purports to associate constantly both sides of the balance sheet in the investment process, it has been called a "holistic" investment methodology.

In essence, the liability-driven investment strategy (LDI) is an investment strategy of a company or individual based on the cash flows needed to fund future liabilities. It is sometimes referred to as a "dedicated portfolio" strategy. It differs from a “benchmark-driven” strategy, which is based on achieving better returns than an external index such as the S&P 500 or a combination of indices that invest in the same types of asset classes. LDI is designed for situations where future liabilities can be predicted with some degree of accuracy. For individuals, the classic example would be the stream of withdrawals from a retirement portfolio that a retiree will make to pay living expenses from the date of retirement to the date of death. For companies, the classic example would be a pension fund that must make future payouts to pensioners over their expected lifetimes (see below).

LDI for individuals 

A retiree following an LDI strategy begins by estimating the income needed each year in the future. Social security payments and any other income is subtracted from the income needed to determine how much will have to be withdrawn each year from the money in the retirement portfolio to meet the income need. These withdrawals become the liabilities that the investment strategy targets. The portfolio must be invested so as to provide the cash flows that match the withdrawals each year, after factoring in adjustments for inflation, irregular spending (such as an ocean cruise every other year), and so on. Individual bonds provide the ability to match the cash flows needed, which is why the term "cash flow matching" is sometimes used to describe this strategy. Because the bonds are dedicated to providing the cash flows, the term "dedicated portfolio" or “asset dedication” is sometimes used to describe the strategy.

LDI for pension funds 

A pension fund following an LDI strategy focuses on the pension-fund assets in the context of the promises made to employees and pensioners (liabilities). This is in contrast to an approach which focuses purely on the asset side of the pension fund balance sheet. There is no single accepted definition or approach to LDI and different managers apply different approaches. Typical LDI strategies involve hedging, in whole or in part, the fund's exposure to changes in interest rates and inflation. These risks can eat into a pension scheme's ability to keep their promises to members. Historically, bonds were used as a partial hedge for these interest rate risks but the recent growth in LDI has focused on using swaps and other derivatives. Various approaches will pursue a "glide path", which, over time, seeks to reduce interest rate and other risks while achieving a return that matches or exceeds the growth in projected pension plan liabilities.  These various approaches offer significant additional flexibility and capital efficiency compared to bonds, but also raise issues of added complexity, especially when the rebalancing of an LDI portfolio following changes in interest rates is considered.

LDI investment strategies have come to prominence in the UK as a result of changes in the regulatory and accounting framework. IAS 19 (one of the International Financial Reporting Standards) requires that UK companies post the funding position of a pension fund on the corporate sponsor's balance sheet. In the US the introduction of FAS 158 (Financial Accounting Standards Board) has created a similar requirement.

See also
Benchmark-driven investment strategy

References

Bibliography
 Michael Ashton, "Maximizing Personal Surplus: Liability-Driven Investment for Individuals", October 28, 2010. Published in "Retirement Security in the New Economy: Paradigm Shifts, New Approaches, and Holistic Strategies", Society of Actuaries, 2011. 
 Vincent Bazi & M. Nicolas J. Firzli, “1st annual World Pensions & Investments Forum”, Revue Analyse Financière, Q2 2011, pp. 7–8
 George Coats, ‘Dutch regulator blamed for pensions losses’, Financial News, Dec 14 2010
 Roy Hoevenaars, “Strategic Asset Allocation and Asset Liability Management”, University of Maastricht, 18 Jan. 2008
 Thomas P. Lemke and Gerald T. Lins, ERISA for Money Managers (Thomson West, 2013).

Actuarial science
Liability (financial accounting)
Pensions
Investment management